Year 1369 (MCCCLXIX) was a common year starting on Monday (link will display the full calendar) of the Julian calendar.

Events 
 January–December 
 February – Vladislav I of Wallachia liberates Vidin from the Hungarians, resulting in the restoration of Ivan Sratsimir on the throne of Bulgaria, in the autumn.
 March 14 – Battle of Montiel: Pedro of Castile loses to an alliance between the French and his half-brother, Henry II. 
 May – King Charles V of France renounces the Treaty of Brétigny, and war is declared between France and England.
 September – Hundred Years' War: The French burn Portsmouth, England; the English raid Picardy and Normandy.
 November 30 – Hundred Years' War: Charles V of France recaptures most of Aquitaine from the English.
 December – Financed by Charles V of France, Welshman Owain Lawgoch launches an invasion fleet against the English, in an attempt to claim the throne of Wales. A storm causes Owain to abandon the invasion.

 Dates unknown 
 The Ottoman Empire invades Bulgaria.
 Venice repels a Hungarian invasion.
 The Thai Ayutthaya Kingdom conquers Cambodia for a second time.
 Charles V of France orders Hugues Aubriot to construct the fortress of the Bastille in Paris.
 Timur names the city of Samarkand as the capital of his empire.
 Košice becomes the first town in Europe to be granted its own coat of arms.
 The Hongwu Emperor of the Chinese Ming dynasty issues a decree ordering every country magistrate in the empire to open a Confucian school of learning.
 The official production of Jingdezhen porcelain in Ming dynasty China is on record.

Births 
 May 28th – Muzio Sforza, Italian condottiero (d. 1424)
 date unknown – William de Ros, 6th Baron de Ros, Lord Treasurer of England (d. 1414)
 probable – King Constantine I of Georgia (d. c. 1412)
 approximate – Jan Hus, Czech priest and philosopher (d. 1415)
 approximate – Margareta, Swedish Sami missionary (d. 1425)

Deaths 
 January 17 – King Peter I of Cyprus (murdered) (b. 1328)
 March 23 – King Peter of Castile (b. 1334) (murdered after the battle of Montiel)
 August 15 – Philippa of Hainault, queen of Edward III of England (b. 1311) (dropsy)
 October 3 – Margaret, Countess of Tyrol (b. 1318)
 November 13 – Thomas de Beauchamp, 11th Earl of Warwick
 date unknown
 Sir John Chandos, English knight
 Agnes Dunbar, Countess of Moray
 Magnus the Pious, Duke of Brunswick-Lüneburg
 Ramathibodi I, first king of Ayutthaya (b. 1314)

References